La Sylvanire ou la Morte-vive ("Sylvanire, or the Dead who Lived") is the title of several related works:

La Sylvanire ou la Morte-vive, a pastoral fable dedicated to Marie de Médicis, is the last work by Honoré d'Urfé. It is a five-act play with a prologue and choruses. Its publication was posthumous, in 1627. The shepherds Aglante and Tirinte are in love with the beautiful and virtuous Sylvanire whom her father, Ménandre, has promised to the rich Théante.
In 1630, La Silvanire ou la Morte vive by Jean Mairet (1604–1686), a pastoral tragicomedy dedicated to Marie-Félicie des Ursins, duchesse de Montmorency, retold the story treated by Honoré d'Urfé. Not needing to cater to the (stereotypically Italian) tastes of Marie de Médicis, Mairet deletes the madman, the satyr and the echo. The work is known mostly for its preface, in which the author affirms the dramatic unities as they were then understood (lieu, temps, action).

French plays
17th-century plays